Tyrone Clinton Spong (born 3 September 1985) is a Surinamese-Dutch professional boxer and mixed martial artist and former kickboxer. As a boxer, he held the WBC and WBO Latino heavyweight titles in 2018. In kickboxing, he is the former WFCA cruiserweight champion, Glory 95kg Slam Champion and It's Showtime 95MAX World champion.

Early life
Tyrone Spong was born in Suriname. In 1990 at the age of five, he moved to the Netherlands with his family. Growing up in the Bijlmermeer neighborhood of Amsterdam, he was often involved in street fighting and began training in kickboxing at the age of thirteen, under the guidance of Lucien Carbin. After getting his "ass whooped" in his first day of training, he was motivated to improve. He had his first match at fifteen and won by first-round knockout. Some of his early sparring partners included Alistair and Valentijn Overeem, and Gilbert Yvel.

Kickboxing career
In 2003, his first year as a professional, Spong won 12 fights. In 2004, he fought Rafi Zouheir at the Battle of Zaandam, winning his first European Muay Thai Title (World Kickboxing Network). In 2004, Spong visited Japan to compete in Shootboxing, losing to Ryuji Goto via unanimous decision. His next fight, in April 2005, was against Belgian Mohammed Ouali for another European Title (WPKL). Spong won the fight by unanimous decision.

In December 2005, at the A-1 Combat Cup in Duisburg, Spong won his first tournament Championship after winning three consecutive fights by knockout.

In 2006, Spong had two significant victories, knockout wins over Muay Thai veteran Joerie Mes and, two weeks later, K-1 fighter Kaoklai Kaennorsing, from Thailand.

In 2007, Spong won the SLAMM world title up to 79 kg by defeating the Thai Yodchai Wor Petchpun via first-round TKO. In the following match, he defeated the Belarusian Dmitry Shakuta.

On January 26, 2008, Spong won the World Full Contact Association (WFCA) World Thaiboxing Cruiserweight Championship by defeating Aurelien Duarte. Following this, he won the KO World Series 2008 by defeating Nikos Sokolis via knockout in the first round, and defended his WFCA Muay Thai title by finishing Ondrej Hutnik with a left liver punch in the second round. On April 26, 2008, Spong faced Azem Maksutaj at the K-1 World Grand Prix 2008 in Amsterdam, winning by knockout in the second round. He then defeated Gary Turner via TKO in the first round. On November 29, 2008, he became the inaugural  It's Showtime 95MAX World champion after beating Zabit Samedov by unanimous decision.

On March 28, 2009, Spong participated in the first K-1 Heavyweight (−100 kg) Title tournament, held in Yokohama, Japan. He was beaten in the semifinals by Gokhan Saki, who won by KO in the extra round.

Spong met Nathan Corbett at Champions of Champions II on June 27, 2009, in what was widely considered a battle between the two best Muay Thai fighters in the world at their weight class, for the W.M.C. world title −93 kg. The fight was close, with Spong knocking Corbett down in the second round, and ended with a controversial decision.  In the third round, Corbett knocked Spong out with a right hook causing the referee to stop the fight.  However, due to the referee's misleading hand signals, Corbett rushed back in and knock Spong down once more, not sure that the fight had been stopped. After considerable confusion, the fight was declared a no contest.

After defeating the Worlds heavyweight champion, Kyotaro on December 5, 2009, Spong fought Jerome Le Banner in April 2010. Similarly to the Corbett fight, Spong broke his right hand in the first round and was knocked down. Despite coming back strongly, he lost by decision.  At the end of the year, he qualified for the K-1 World Grand Prix 2010 Final, defeating veteran Ray Sefo in an elimination match, only to lose to eventual winner Alistair Overeem at the quarter final stage in what was a more competitive fight than most had predicted, as Overeem was much the bigger fighter.  At the start of 2011, Spong had to vacate the It's Showtime 95MAX world title due to a number of issues, such as not having had a title defense in the allocated two years and his management stating that he had moved up in weight to fight as a heavyweight.

Spong knocked out Igor Mihaljevic with a left knee in the first round at It's Showtime 2011 Lyon on May 14, 2011. He defeated Loren Javier Jorge by unanimous decision at It's Showtime Madrid 2011 on June 18, 2011.

Spong faced Melvin Manhoef at It's Showtime 2012 in Leeuwarden on January 28, 2012,  and won by unanimous decision. He faced the legendary Dutchman Peter Aerts at an It's Showtime event in Brussels, Belgium on June 30, 2012, and won by knockout in the third round.

Spong fought Remy Bonjasky at Glory 5: London in London, England on March 23, 2013.  Spong won via one-punch KO with a right hook in the second round.

Spong returned to 95 kg to fight in the Glory 9: New York - 2013 95kg Slam in New York City, New York, United States on June 22, 2013. He had a scare in the quarter-finals when he was dropped by Michael Duut soon after the bout started, although it was not counted by the referee. Just moments after returning to his feet, Spong landed a crushing right hand on Duut, knocking Duut out and ensuring Spong's passage to the semifinals against Filip Verlinden. The Verlinden match was a technical battle, with Spong outpointing the Belgian and taking a unanimous decision. A match with Danyo Ilunga awaited him in the final but it ended in a controversial and anticlimactic fashion. As the fight began, both fighters met in the center of the ring and Spong unloaded a flurry of punches. As Ilunga covered up and prepared to counter, referee Mufadel Elghazaoui jumped in and stopped the fight, giving Spong the TKO win at just sixteen seconds of the first round. Although, it was later revealed that there was a "no standing eight count" rule in effect at the event as per the New York State Athletic Commission's regulations, the stoppage was still deemed premature by much of the kickboxing community.

In a long-awaited rematch, Spong fought Corbett again at Glory 11: Chicago - Heavyweight World Championship Tournament in Hoffman Estates, Illinois, United States on October 12, 2013. Spong dropped Corbett twice with left hooks and won by second-round TKO .

Spong fought in the Glory 15: Istanbul - Light Heavyweight World Championship Tournament in Istanbul, Turkey on April 12, 2014, competing for the inaugural Glory Light Heavyweight Championship. After defeating Saulo Cavalari via unanimous decision in the semifinals, he then faced Gökhan Saki in a highly anticipated rematch in the final. Midway through the opening round, Spong threw a kick to Saki's left leg. Saki checked the kick, causing Spong's lower right leg to fracture immediately and end the fight via TKO.

Spong underwent surgery to repair his broken leg and returned to training in October 2014. On 14 April 2016, he stated that he had retired from kickboxing and was looking forward to new challenges.

Mixed martial arts career

World Series of Fighting
Spong made his highly anticipated MMA debut against Travis Bartlett at World Series of Fighting 1 on November 3, 2012, in Las Vegas, Nevada in the light heavyweight (205 lb) division. For his MMA debut he trained with the Blackzilians for over a year with such fighters as K-1 World Grand Prix winner and former Strikeforce heavyweight champion Alistair Overeem and former UFC light heavyweight champions Rashad Evans and Vitor Belfort. Spong knocked out Bartlett at 3:15 of the first round with a straight right.

Spong faced Angel DeAnda at World Series of Fighting 4 on August 10, 2013, in the main event. Spong won via unanimous decision.

Eagle Fighting Championship
Spong was scheduled to face Bigfoot Silva on January 28, 2022 at EFC 44. However, Silva pulled out of the bout and was replaced by Sergei Kharitonov. Spong lost the fight by technical knockout in the second round.

Boxing career

Spong decided to begin a career in professional boxing at age 29. His first boxing match was on March 6, 2015, beating Gabor Farkas by KO in the first round. Spong defeated Juan Carlos Salas by KO in Round 1 at Brave Warriors in Action PPV event on May 27, 2017, in Mexico. On October 7, 2017, Spong won the WBC Latino Heavyweight Championship.

Spong vs. Silgado 
On August 31, 2018, Spong defeated Santander Silago via KO in the first round.

Spong vs. Perea 
In his next fight, Spong defeated Ytalo Perea via split decision. The scorecards read 97–93, 96–94 and 94–96 in favor of Spong.

Spong vs. Minda 
His following bout came against Jeyson Minda. Spong ended the bout early via a second-round KO.

Spong was due to face Oleksandr Usyk on October 12, 2019, but the bout was called off after Spong tested positive for the banned substance clomifene. However, his third sample, which was tested by VADA, came back negative.

Titles

Kickboxing
Glory
2014 Glory Light Heavyweight World Championship Tournament Runner-up
2013 Glory 95kg Slam Tournament Champion
It's Showtime
2008 1st It's Showtime World 95MAX champion (Defense: 0)
World Full Contact Association
2008 World Full Contact Association (W.F.C.A.) Thaiboxing World Cruiserweight champion (Defense: 1)
KO World Series
2008 KO World Series '08 Oceania winner
SLAMM!! Events
2007 1st SLAMM Events 79 kg class champion (Defense: 0)
A1 World League
2005 A1 World League winner
World Professional Kickboxing League
2005 W.P.K.L. European Middleweight champion (Defense: 0)
World Kickboxing Network
2004 World Kickboxing Network (W.K.N.) Thaiboxing European Middleweight champion (Defense: 0)
Muay Thai Bond Nederland
 M.T.B.N. Muay Thai Dutch Junior class −66 kg class champion (Defense: 0)

Awards
2013 Kickboxingplanet.com Kickboxer of the year 
2013 Liver Kick.com Fighter of the Year

Boxing
2017 WBC Latino Heavyweight Champion
2018 WBO Latino Heavyweight Champion

Personal life
Spong has four children.  He is an avid animal enthusiast, as is evidenced by the majority of his tattoos. He is the owner of several pit bull terriers, which he bred himself.  Spong has trained in the United States with Floyd Mayweather Sr. He has also been decorated with the Honorary Order of the Yellow Star the highest order of Suriname by President  Dési Bouterse.

Professional boxing record

Kickboxing record

|-
|- align="center" bgcolor="#FFBBBB"
| 2014-04-12 || Loss ||align=left|Gökhan Saki || Glory 15: Istanbul – Light Heavyweight World Championship Tournament, Final || Istanbul, Turkey || TKO (leg injury) || 1 || 1:39
|-
! style="background:white" colspan=9 |
|-
|- style="text-align:center;" bgcolor="#CCFFCC"
| 2014-04-12 || Win ||align=left|Saulo Cavalari || Glory 15: Istanbul – Light Heavyweight World Championship Tournament, Semi Finals || Istanbul, Turkey || Decision (unanimous) || 3 || 3:00
|-
|- style="text-align:center;" bgcolor="#CCFFCC"
| 2013-10-12 || Win ||align=left|Nathan Corbett || Glory 11: Chicago || Hoffman Estates, Illinois, USA || TKO (left hook) || 2 || 1:10
|-
|- style="text-align:center;" bgcolor="#CCFFCC"
| 2013-06-22 || Win ||align=left|Danyo Ilunga || Glory 9: New York – 95 kg Slam Tournament, Finals || New York City, New York, USA || TKO (punches) || 1 || 0:16
|-
! style="background:white" colspan=9 |
|-
|- style="text-align:center;" bgcolor="#CCFFCC"
| 2013-06-22 || Win ||align=left|Filip Verlinden || Glory 9: New York – 95 kg Slam Tournament, Semi Finals || New York City, New York, USA || Decision (unanimous) || 3 || 3:00
|-
|- style="text-align:center;" bgcolor="#CCFFCC"
| 2013-06-22 || Win ||align=left|Michael Duut || Glory 9: New York – 95 kg Slam Tournament, Quarter Finals || New York City, New York, USA || KO (right hook) || 1 || 0:31
|-
|- style="text-align:center;" bgcolor="#CCFFCC"
| 2013-03-23 || Win ||align=left|Remy Bonjasky || Glory 5: London || London, England || KO (right hook) || 2 || 2:02
|- style="text-align:center;" bgcolor="#CCFFCC"
| 2012-06-30 || Win ||align=left|Peter Aerts || Music Hall & BFN Group present: It's Showtime 57 & 58 || Brussels, Belgium ||  KO (punch) || 3 || 2:10
|- style="text-align:center;" bgcolor="#CCFFCC"
| 2012-01-28 || Win ||align=left|Melvin Manhoef || It's Showtime 2012 in Leeuwarden || Amsterdam, Netherlands || Decision (unanimous)  || 3 || 3:00
|- align="center" bgcolor="#CCFFCC"
| 2011-06-18 || Win ||align=left|Loren Javier Jorge || It's Showtime Madrid 2011 || Madrid, Spain || Decision (unanimous) || 3 || 3:00
|-
|- align="center" bgcolor="#CCFFCC"
| 2011-05-14 || Win ||align=left|Igor Mihaljevic || It's Showtime 2011 Lyon || Lyon, France || KO (left knee) || 1 || 2:01
|-
|- align="center" bgcolor="#FFBBBB"
| 2010-12-11 || Loss ||align=left|Alistair Overeem || K-1 World GP 2010 Final, Quarter Final || Tokyo, Japan || Decision (unanimous) || 3 || 3:00
|-
|- align="center"  bgcolor="#CCFFCC"
| 2010-10-02 || Win ||align=left|Ray Sefo || K-1 World GP 2010 Seoul Final 16 || Seoul, Republic of Korea || Decision (unanimous) || 3 || 3:00
|-
! style="background:white" colspan=9 |
|-
|- align="center"  bgcolor="#FFBBBB"
| 2010-04-03 || Loss ||align=left|Jerome Le Banner || K-1 World Grand Prix 2010 in Yokohama || Yokohama, Japan || Decision (unanimous) || 3 || 3:00
|- align="center"  bgcolor="#CCFFCC"
| 2009-12-05 || Win ||align=left|Keijiro Maeda || K-1 World Grand Prix 2009 Final || Yokohama, Japan || Decision (unanimous) || 3 || 3:00
|- align="center"  bgcolor="#c5d2ea"
| 2009-06-27 ||NC||align=left|Nathan Corbett || Champions of Champions II || Montego Bay, Jamaica || No contest || 3 || 0:55
|- align="center"  bgcolor="#CCFFCC"
| 2009-05-16 || Win ||align=left|Attila Karacs || It's Showtime 2009 Amsterdam || Amsterdam, Netherlands || Decision (split) || 3 || 3:00
|- align="center"  bgcolor="#FFBBBB"
| 2009-03-28 || Loss ||align=left|Gökhan Saki || K-1 World GP 2009 in Yokohama || Yokohama, Japan || KO (right hook) || 4 ||  1:58
|- align="center"  bgcolor="#CCFFCC"
| 2009-01-24 || Win ||align=left|Samir Benazzouz || Beast of the East || Zutphen, Netherlands || TKO (corner stoppage) || 3 || 2:23
|- align="center"  bgcolor="#CCFFCC"
| 2008-11-29 || Win ||align=left|Zabit Samedov || It's Showtime 2008 Eindhoven || Eindhoven, Netherlands || Decision (unanimous) || 5 || 3:00
|-
! style="background:white" colspan=9 | 
|-
|- align="center"  bgcolor="#CCFFCC"
| 2008-10-05 || Win ||align=left|Gary Turner || K.O. Events "Tough Is Not Enough" || Rotterdam, Netherlands || TKO (doctor stoppage) || 1 || 1:05
|- align="center"  bgcolor="#CCFFCC"
| 2008-04-26 || Win ||align=left|Azem Maksutaj || K-1 World GP 2008 in Amsterdam || Amsterdam, Netherlands || KO (knee strike) || 2 || 0:45
|- align="center"  bgcolor="#CCFFCC"
| 2008-03-15 || Win ||align=left|Ondrej Hutnik || It's Showtime 75MAX Trophy 2008, World Title Fight || 's-Hertogenbosch, Netherlands || KO (Left liver punch) || 2 || 2:32
|-
! style="background:white" colspan=9 | 
|-
|- align="center"  bgcolor="#CCFFCC"
| 2008-02-09 || Win ||align=left|Nikos Sokolis || KO World Series 2008 in Auckland || Auckland, New Zealand || KO (left liver punch) || 1 || 2:25
|-
! style="background:white" colspan=9 | 
|-
|- align="center"  bgcolor="#CCFFCC"
| 2008-02-09 || Win ||align=left|Chad Walker || KO World Series 2008 in Auckland || Auckland, New Zealand || KO (overhand right) || 1 || 1:08
|- align="center"  bgcolor="#CCFFCC"
| 2008-01-26 || Win ||align=left|Aurelien Duarte || Beast of the East || Zutphen, Netherlands || Decision (unanimous) || 3 || 3:00
|-
! style="background:white" colspan=9 | 
|-
|- align="center"  bgcolor="#CCFFCC"
| 2007-12-24 || Win ||align=left|Rasmus Zoeylner || Return of the King 2 || Paramaribo, Suriname || KO (strikes) || 2 || N/A
|- align="center"  bgcolor="#CCFFCC"
| 2007-10-27 || Win ||align=left|Emil Zoraj || One Night in Bangkok || Antwerp, Belgium || TKO (doctor stoppage) || 4 || 1:02
|- align="center"  bgcolor="#CCFFCC"
| 2007-08-26 || Win ||align=left|Human Nikmaslak || Return of the King 1 || Paramaribo, Suriname || KO (knee strike) || 1 || 2:31
|- align="center"  bgcolor="#CCFFCC"
| 2007-06-02 || Win ||align=left|Dmitry Shakuta || Gentleman Fight Night IV || Tilburg, Netherlands || Decision || 5 || 3:00
|- align="center"  bgcolor="#CCFFCC"
| 2007-05-06 || Win ||align=left|Yodchai Wor Petchpun || SLAMM "Nederland vs Thailand III" || Haarlem, Netherlands || TKO (referee stoppage) || 1 || 2:38
|-
! style="background:white" colspan=9 | 
|-
|- align="center"  bgcolor="#FFBBBB"
| 2007-03-25 || Loss ||align=left|Amir Zeyada || Rings Gala, Vechtsenbanen || Utrecht, Netherlands || TKO (referee stoppage/punches) || 3 || 1:49
|- align="center"  bgcolor="#CCFFCC"
| 2006-11-12 || Win ||align=left|Joerie Mes || Pride & Honor Ahoy 2006 || Rotterdam, Netherlands || TKO (knee) || 5 || 1:12
|- align="center"  bgcolor="#CCFFCC"
| 2006-10-01 || Win ||align=left|Kaoklai Kaennorsing || SLAMM "Nederland vs Thailand II" || Almere, Netherlands || KO (right punch) || 1 || 1:55
|- align="center"  bgcolor="#CCFFCC"
| 2006-06-18 || Win ||align=left|Sem Braan || 2H2H The Road To Tokyo || Amsterdam, Netherlands || KO (left hook) || 3 || 1:40
|- align="center"  bgcolor="#CCFFCC"
| 2006-06-03 || Win ||align=left|Henry Akdeniz || Gentleman Fight Night 3 || Tilburg, Netherlands || TKO (doctor stoppage) || 3 || 3:00
|- align="center"  bgcolor="#CCFFCC"
| 2006-05-06 || Win ||align=left|Farid M'Laika || Gala de Kickboxing || Geneva, Switzerland || Decision (unanimous) || 5 || 2:00
|- align="center"  bgcolor="#CCFFCC"
| 2006-04-29 || Win ||align=left|Cho In Jun || MARS World Fighting GP || Seoul, Korea || KO (strikes) || 1 || 2:07
|- align="center"  bgcolor="#CCFFCC"
| 2005-12-03 || Win ||align=left|Senol Kiziltas || A-1 Combat League || Duisburg, Germany || TKO (knee) || 2 || N/A
|-
! style="background:white" colspan=9 | 
|-
|- align="center"  bgcolor="#CCFFCC"
| 2005-12-03 || Win ||align=left|Senol Cetin || A-1 Combat League || Duisburg, Germany || TKO (corner stoppage) || 1 || N/A
|- align="center"  bgcolor="#CCFFCC"
| 2005-12-03 || Win ||align=left|Rene Litchko || A-1 Combat League || Duisburg, Germany || KO (right hook) || 1 || 0:45
|- align="center"  bgcolor="#CCFFCC"
| 2005-10-09 || Win ||align=left|Vincent Vielvoye || Rotterdam Rumble || Rotterdam, Netherlands || Decision || 5 || 3:00
|- align="center"  bgcolor="#CCFFCC"
| 2005-05-08 || Win ||align=left|Youness El Mhassani || Muay Thai Gala || Amsterdam, Netherlands || Decision || 5 || 3:00
|- align="center"  bgcolor="#CCFFCC"
| 2005-04-09 || Win ||align=left|Mohammed Ouali || Muay Thai Champions League XIV || Netherlands || Decision || 5 || 3:00
|-
! style="background:white" colspan=9 | 
|-
|- align="center"  bgcolor="#CCFFCC"
| 2004-12-23 || Win ||align=left|Renato Hasset || The Night of Legend || Paramaribo, Suriname || KO (strikes) || 4 || N/A
|- align="center"  bgcolor="#CCFFCC"
| 2004-11-14 || Win ||align=left|Richard Weston || Muay Thai/Mixed Fight Gala, Sporthal Stedenwijk || Almere, Netherlands || KO (strikes) || 1 || N/A
|- align="center"  bgcolor="#CCFFCC"
| 2004-10-17 || Win ||align=left|Rafi Zoufeir || Battle in Zaandam II || Zaandam, Netherlands || TKO (low kicks) || 3 || N/A
|-
! style="background:white" colspan=9 | 
|-
|- align="center"  bgcolor="#FFBBBB"
| 2004-04-18 || Loss ||align=left|Ryuji Goto || Shoot　boxing: Infinity-S Vol.2 || Tokyo, Japan || Decision || 3 || 3:00
|- align="center"  bgcolor="#CCFFCC"
| 2004-03-21 || Win ||align=left|Hamid El Caid || Profighters Gala in Almere || Almere, Netherlands || Decision || 5 || 3:00
|- align="center"  bgcolor="#CCFFCC"
| 2004-02-22 || Win ||align=left|William Diender || 2H2H || Rotterdam, Netherlands || Decision (majority) || 5 || 3:00
|- align="center"  bgcolor="#c5d2ea"
| 2003-11-12 || Draw ||align=left|Youness El Mhassani || Veni, Vidi, Vici II || Veenendaal, Netherlands || Draw || 5 || 3:00
|- align="center"  bgcolor="#CCFFCC"
| 2003-11-02 || Win ||align=left|Xavier Gatez || Immortality || Amsterdam, Netherlands || KO (strikes) || 2 || N/A
|- align="center"  bgcolor="#CCFFCC"
| 2003-10-13 || Win ||align=left|Rocky Grandjean || 2H2H in Ahoy || Netherlands || TKO (doctor stoppage) || 2 || N/A
|- align="center"  bgcolor="#CCFFCC"
| 2003-07-04 || Win ||align=left|Gregory Costina || Baas Sports || Willemstad, Curaçao || TKO (low kicks) || 4 || N/A
|- align="center"  bgcolor="#CCFFCC"
| 2003-05-18 || Win ||align=left|Melvin Rozenblad || Killerdome III || Amsterdam, Netherlands || Decision || 5 || 3:00
|-
! style="background:white" colspan=9 | 
|-
|- align="center"  bgcolor="#CCFFCC"
| 2003-04-19 || Win ||align=left|Henry Akendiz || Beast of The East || Zutphen, Netherlands || TKO (corner stoppage) || 1 || 3:00
|- align="center"  bgcolor="#CCFFCC"
| 2003-04-13 || Win ||align=left|Jan van Denderen || East Side III || Gorinchem, Netherlands || Decision || 5 || 2:00
|- align="center"  bgcolor="#CCFFCC"
| 2003-02-02 || Win ||align=left|Harry Lodewijks || Killerdome II || Amsterdam, Netherlands || KO (strikes) || 1 || N/A
|- align="center"  bgcolor="#CCFFCC"
| 2003-01-11 || Win ||align=left|Tarik Slimani || Dudok Arena || Hilversum, Netherlands || N/A || N/A || N/A
|- align="center"  bgcolor="#CCFFCC"
| 2002-10-27 || Win ||align=left|Ray Staring || Beast of The East || Arnhem, Netherlands || Decision || 5 || 2:00
|- align="center"  bgcolor="#FFBBBB"
| 2002-05-19 || Loss ||align=left|Amir Zeyada || Itai-Te Promotions, Thaiboksgala Predators III|| Amsterdam, Netherlands || KO (slam) || 4 || 0:47
|- align="center"  bgcolor="#CCFFCC"
| 2002-03-08 || Win ||align=left|Dave van der Ploeg || Beast of The East || Zutphen, Netherlands || Decision || 5 || 2:00
|- align="center"  bgcolor="#CCFFCC"
| 2002-03-03 || Win ||align=left|Olli Koch || Loasana Promotions, The Palace  || Groningen, Netherlands || KO (strikes) || 1 || N/A
|- align="center"  bgcolor="#CCFFCC"
| 2001-09-22 || Win ||align=left|Werner Stoel || Champions Gym Gala in Hanenhof || Geleen, Netherlands || Decision || 5 || 2:00
|-
| colspan=9 | Legend:

Mixed martial arts record

|-
|Loss
|align=center|2–1
|Sergei Kharitonov
|TKO (punches)
|Eagle FC 44
|
|align=center|2
|align=center|2:55
|Miami, Florida, United States
|
|-
| Win
|align=center| 2–0
| Angel DeAnda
| Decision (unanimous)
| WSOF 4
|
|align=center| 3
|align=center| 5:00
|Ontario, California, United States
|
|-
| Win
|align=center| 1–0
| Travis Bartlett
| KO (punch)
| WSOF 1
|
|align=center| 1
|align=center| 3:15
|Paradise, Nevada, United States
|

See also
List of K-1 events
List of It's Showtime champions
List of male kickboxers

References

External links
Profile at K-1

Tyrone Spong – Profile, News Archive & Current Rankings at Box.Live

1985 births
Living people
Surinamese male boxers
Dutch male boxers
Heavyweight boxers
Surinamese male kickboxers
Dutch male kickboxers
Welterweight kickboxers
Middleweight kickboxers
Light heavyweight kickboxers
Cruiserweight kickboxers
Heavyweight kickboxers
Dutch Muay Thai practitioners
Surinamese Muay Thai practitioners
Dutch male mixed martial artists
Surinamese male mixed martial artists
Light heavyweight mixed martial artists
Heavyweight mixed martial artists
Mixed martial artists utilizing boxing
Mixed martial artists utilizing Muay Thai
Mixed martial artists utilizing shootboxing
Surinamese emigrants to the Netherlands
Sportspeople from Paramaribo
Doping cases in boxing
Dutch sportspeople in doping cases
Surinamese sportspeople in doping cases